The Cheval Navarrin, also called Navarin, Navarrois, Tarbais, Tarbésan or Bigourdin, is an extinct breed of light saddle-horse from south-western France. It was bred principally in the plains of the Pyrenees around Tarbes, and in Bigorre, now in the Hautes-Pyrénées. It stood about 148–151 centimetres at the withers. Lively and elegant, it had an excellent reputation throughout the 18th century. It was used as a mount for light cavalry, as a saddle-horse and for classical dressage.

References 

Horse breeds originating in France
Extinct horse breeds
Horse breeds